Karen Clark may refer to:
 Karen Clark (politician)
 Karen Clark (bassoonist)
 Karen Clark (synchronized swimmer)
 Karen Clark (rower)
 Karen Clark Sheard, née Clark, American Gospel singer, musician and songwriter

See also
 Karen Clarke (disambiguation)